Stephen Brown (born 9 May 1956) is a British sprint canoer who competed in the late 1970s and early 1980s. He won a bronze medal in the K-4 10000 m event at the 1981 ICF Canoe Sprint World Championships in Nottingham.

Brown also competed two Summer Olympics, but did not reach the finals in either of those games. At the 1976 Summer Olympics, he was eliminated in the repechage round of the K-2 1000 m event. Four years later in Moscow, Brown was disqualified in the semifinals of the K-4 1000 m event.

References

Sports-reference.com profile

1956 births
Canoeists at the 1976 Summer Olympics
Canoeists at the 1980 Summer Olympics
Living people
Olympic canoeists of Great Britain
ICF Canoe Sprint World Championships medalists in kayak
British male canoeists